The year 558 BC was a year of the pre-Julian Roman calendar. In the Roman Empire, it was known as year 196 Ab urbe condita. The denomination 558 BC for this year has been used since the early medieval period, when the Anno Domini calendar era became the prevalent method in Europe for naming years.

Events
 Hegesias is removed as Archon of Athens.
 The Chinese state of Jin defeats its rival state of Qin in battle.

Births
 Bimbisara, king of the Magadha Empire in ancient India

Deaths
 Solon, Athenian statesman and poet
 Duke Dao of Jin, ruler of the State of Jin

References